The 1985 Silverstone 1000 km was the third round of the 1985 World Endurance Championship. It took place at the Silverstone Circuit, Great Britain on May 12, 1985.

Official results
Class winners in bold. Cars failing to complete 75% of the winner's distance marked as Not Classified (NC).

Statistics
 Pole Position - #4 Martini Racing - 1:10.84
 Fastest Lap - #14 Richard Lloyd Racing - 1:15.96
 Average Speed - 204.115 km/h

References

 
 

Silverstone
Silverstone
6 Hours of Silverstone